Minna Lewinson (June 28, 1897 – November 19, 1938) was an American journalist and joint winner of the 1918 Pulitzer Prize for Newspaper History, along with Henry Beetle Hough. She is notable as the first woman to win a journalism Pulitzer Prize and work for the New York Times.

Education 
Lewinson was born in New York City and attended Barnard College at Columbia University to study journalism, earning a B.Litt. She was one of 11 female graduates of the Columbia University Graduate School of Journalism in 1918, compared to eight men. This was unprecedented at the time, and women were only gaining major access to the school due to a wartime shortage of male journalists.

Lewinson and Hough were jointly awarded the 1918 Pulitzer Prize for their paper 'A History of the Services Rendered to the Public by the American Press During the Year 1917', described as "the best history of the services rendered to the public by the American press during the preceding year". The prize was worth $1,000, and the particular prize category ('Newspaper History') was only awarded the one time. Jury notes indicate that the prize was considered for awarding every year from the first ceremony in 1917 through to 1924, however the prize was removed from the rosters in 1925 still with only two recipients; Lewinson and Hough.

Career 
Lewinson worked as a copy writer, as a reporter and columnist for Daily Investment News, and as a reporter for Women's Wear Daily. Lewinson was the first woman hired by the Wall Street Journal, in 1918, working as a copy editor. She left the newspaper in 1923, and no other women were hired by the journal for several more decades.

References

External links 
 

 

1897 births
1938 deaths
Pulitzer Prize for History winners
The Wall Street Journal people
Barnard College alumni
American women journalists
American women columnists
Columbia University Graduate School of Journalism alumni
American women historians
20th-century American women
Historians from New York (state)